Ostrich Churchyard is an album by Orange Juice, released on CD in 1992. Tracks 1 to 12 were recorded live at the Hellfire Club, Glasgow on 17 May 1981. The remaining tracks were from a John Peel session recording of October 1980.

Track listing
All tracks composed by Edwyn Collins; except where indicated
"Louise Louise" – 2:50
"Three Cheers for Our Side" (James Kirk) – 2:52
"In a Nutshell" – 4:06
"Satellite City" – 2:42
"Consolation Prize" – 3:10
"Holiday Hymn" (Vic Godard) – 3:00
"Intuition Told Me (Part 1)" – 1:14
"Intuition Told Me (Part 2)" – 3:22
"Wan Light" (James Kirk) – 2:30
"Dying Day" – 3:09
"Texas Fever" – 1:44
"Tender Object" – 4:40
"Falling and Laughing" – 3:23 (23-10-80 Peel Session)
"Love Sick" – 2:23 (23-10-80 Peel Session)
"Poor Old Soul" – 2:34 (23-10-80 Peel Session)
"You Old Eccentric" (James Kirk) – 2:21 (23-10-80 Peel Session)
"Wan Light" (James Kirk) (19-1-81 Radio 1 Session, Japanese release only) – 2:29

References

1992 compilation albums
Orange Juice (band) albums